The Phantom of Liberty is a 1974 surrealist comedy film by Luis Buñuel, produced by Serge Silberman and starring Adriana Asti, Julien Bertheau and Jean-Claude Brialy. It features a non-linear plot structure that consists of various otherwise unrelated episodes linked only by the movement of certain characters from one situation to another and exhibits Buñuel's typical ribald satirical humor combined with a series of increasingly outlandish and far-fetched incidents intended to challenge the viewer's pre-conceived notions about the stability of social mores and reality.

Plot 
The opening scene is inspired by "The Kiss", a short story by Spanish post-romanticist writer Gustavo Adolfo Bécquer and by Francisco Goya's painting The Third of May 1808. Toledo, 1808. The city has been occupied by French Napoleonic troops. A firing squad executes a small group of Spanish rebels who cry out "Long live chains!" or "Death to the gabachos!" – a Spanish pejorative term for "Frenchmen". The troops are encamped in a Catholic church which they desecrate by drinking, singing, and eating the communion wafers. The captain caresses a statue of Doña Elvira de Castañeda and is knocked unconscious by the statue of her husband, Don Pedro López de Ayala. In revenge, the captain exhumes Doña Elvira's body to find her face has not decomposed; there is a suggestion of intended necrophilia.

Cut to the present day where a nanny is reading the voice-over from a book whilst seated on a park bench. The children in her care are given some pictures by a strange man in the park. There are implications of child abduction or paedophilia. Cut to a close-up of a spider and the interior of a bourgeois apartment where a man is "fed up with symmetry" as he rearranges his mantelpiece. The children arrive home and show the pictures to their parents who are shocked that the girls have such images. The parents are disgusted and yet erotically stimulated by the images. When we see the images, they are revealed as picture postcards of French architecture. The parents then let the children keep the pictures and dismiss the nanny. At bedtime, the husband cannot sleep as he is kept awake by a cockerel, a watch-carrying woman, a postman and an emu wandering through his bedroom.

In the next scene, the husband visits his doctor, who dismisses these nighttime experiences as apparitions despite the fact that the husband has physical evidence in the form of a letter from the nocturnal postman. The evidence is never considered as the doctor's nurse interrupts the conversation to tell her employer that she must visit her sick father. The nurse drives through a rainy night, meeting a military tank on the road that is apparently hunting foxes. The soldiers tell her that the road ahead is blocked. The nurse drives to an isolated inn.

A storm breaks as the nurse checks in at the small rural inn. Some Carmelite monks are also staying at the hotel. She takes supper in her room while a flamenco dancer and guitarist perform in an adjacent room. The monks interrupt her as she is dressing for bed. They offer to use a holy effigy and prayer to assist her sick father then begin to pray. Time has passed and the monks are playing a game of poker with the nurse and the proprietor, gambling with holy relics, smoking and drinking alcohol.

That same night, some new guests arrive at the hotel; a young man and his aunt. The young nephew has brought his aunt to the hotel for an incestuous affair. They retire to their room, the elderly aunt confesses that she is a virgin, when the nephew pulls back the sheets to look at her naked body, she has the body of a young woman. The nephew is refused by his aunt and leaves his room to join another couple (a hatter and his female assistant) for a drink. The nurse and the four monks are also invited into the hatter's room. While the guests are socialising, the hatter's assistant dons a dominatrix outfit with a whip. The hatter, who is wearing bottomless trousers, proceeds to be masochistically flagellated by his assistant in front of the other guests who are shocked and leave. The nephew returns to his aunt, who is now willing to make love with him.

The next morning, the nurse leaves for the town of Argenton, giving a lift to another resident who is having breakfast in the bar. This resident is a professor at the police academy. He is dropped off at work where he gives a lecture to a class of delinquent policemen, who behave like schoolchildren, on the subject of the relativism of laws, customs and taboos. The lecture is constantly interrupted, until only two officers are left in the class. The professor continues, using a dinner party at his friends' house to illustrate a point he is making. We then cut to the 'dinner' party which is being held in a modern bourgeois apartment.

The guests are seated around the table on flushing toilets. They politely discuss various issues around the topic of defecation whilst publicly using the toilets that they are sitting on. When a guest is hungry, he excuses himself and retires to the dining room, a private cubicle, to eat food.

We cut back to the police lecture. The two policeman go on duty where they stop a speeding motorist (Mr Legendre) who is rushing to see his doctor. Mr Legendre is eventually told by his doctor that he has cancer and offered a cigarette; he slaps his doctor and returns home. Once home, he tells his wife that nothing is wrong with him. They receive a telephone call informing them that their daughter has disappeared from school.

We now cut to the school where the teachers insist that the little girl has vanished despite the fact that she is physically present. Her disappearance is reported to the police, the girl is present but none of the adults admit to her presence. In this absurdist scene, she is there – the adults are able to see and speak to her – yet they act as if she is missing. Finally, the policeman charged with finding her is given her photograph and asks if he can take her with him.

We follow one of the policemen, who is having his shoes shined. We then follow the man who is sitting next to him to the top of a tower block (the Tour Montparnasse). This man is a sniper who randomly kills people in the streets below. He is arrested, found guilty, and sentenced to death but leaves the courtroom to be treated as a celebrity.

Mr Legendre is called to see the Prefect of Police who returns the missing daughter. The Prefect is about to read a letter explaining how the girl was found, but is interrupted and leaves to visit a bar. In the bar, he meets a woman who looks like his dead sister (we see a flashback in which he remembers his sister playing the piano, naked). He then receives a telephone call from his dead sister, asking him to meet her at the mausoleum. When he visits the cemetery at night, he finds a telephone in the crypt by his sister's coffin and her hair is hanging out of the coffin. He is suddenly arrested for desecration by officers who refuse to believe that he is the Prefect of Police.

The Prefect is taken to his office, where a different man has taken his place. The two men treat each other cordially and discuss crowd control as if they are acquainted. We see the animals in the zoo, the two police chiefs arrive, and direct police control of an unseen riot. A voice is heard offscreen crying out "Long live chains!" as at the beginning of the film. The tolling church bells and gunshots from the opening scene of the film are also repeated. The film ends with a close-up shot of an ostrich's head.

Cast

 Adriana Asti - the Prefect of Police's sister/Lady in black
 Julien Bertheau - the First Prefect of Police
 Jean-Claude Brialy - Mr. Foucauld
 Adolfo Celi - Doctor Pasolini
 Anne-Marie Deschodt - Mlle Rosenblum
 Paul Frankeur - Innkeeper
 Pierre Lary - The sniper
 Michael Lonsdale - The hatter
 Pierre Maguelon - Gérard, the policeman
 François Maistre - Professor
 Hélène Perdrière - Aunt
 Michel Piccoli - Second Prefect of Police
 Claude Piéplu - Commissioner of police
 Jean Rochefort - Mr. Legendre
 Bernard Verley - Judge
 Monica Vitti - Mrs. Foucauld
 Marie-France Pisier - Mrs. Calmette
 Milena Vukotic - Nurse
 Guy Montagné - Young Monk
 Marcel Pérès - Old Monk
 Paul Le Person - Gabriel, Monk
 Bernard Musson - Monk
 Chantal Ladesou - Toilet paper's woman

Historical and social context

The Phantom of Liberty was Buñuel's penultimate film. At the time of production, he was 74 years old and considering retirement. Buñuel summarizes many of the concerns that permeate his work:

The film contains short incidents and scenarios collected from throughout Buñuel's life, arranged in the style of a surreal game where seemingly disconnected ideas are linked by chance encounters. Writer Gary Indiana notes that the film was written by Buñuel and Carrière "telling each other their dreams every morning."

The film is infused with his personal experience. It opens in Toledo, Spain, a city that so impressed the young Buñuel that in 1923 he founded a group called the "Order of Toledo". When he was a student in Madrid, he saw a dead woman's hair 'growing' from a tomb in the moonlight. The sight made a strong impression on him and he used it in this film some fifty years later. In the 1940s, when he lived in Los Angeles but had no prospects of film work, he wrote down an idea about a missing girl whose parents fruitlessly search for her while she is beside them; invisible and yet not invisible. When the Carmelite monk says "If everyone prayed every day to Saint Joseph, peace and quiet would prevail", this was a quote that had stuck with Buñuel when he was visiting a monastery in the 1960s. One of the most poignant biographical details used in The Phantom of Liberty is the sequence when the doctor tries to avoid telling his patient that he has cancer of the liver. This was based on Buñuel's experience of being told that he had a cyst on his liver (he died of cancer of the liver in 1983).

The title of the film is a homage to Karl Marx and Friedrich Engels’ Communist Manifesto, specifically a reference to the opening sentence: "A spectre is haunting Europe – the spectre of Communism" (in French, "spectre" is translated as fantôme). This sentence refers to the way in which the idea of Communism was being used pejoratively by the authorities in the mid-19th century to attack all political parties opposed to the established order (church, aristocracy and state). The Communist Manifesto was written to offer a positive vision of the views, aims and tendencies of Communists from across Europe. Buñuel and the Surrealists were closely linked to the Communists in the 1930s, but by the 1950s he had developed a greater antipathy towards the party.

The title of The Phantom of Liberty is also taken from this line of dialogue from his 1969 film The Milky Way: "I experience in every event that my thoughts and my will are not in my power. And that my liberty is only a phantom." It likely refers to the illusive nature of freedom, to the ways in which our destinies are controlled by chance, or, as Buñuel would have it:

This quote not only parallels the structure of the film but also summarizes Buñuel's philosophy of life. After being awarded an Oscar for Best Foreign Language Film in the previous year (for The Discreet Charm of the Bourgeoisie, also with producer Serge Silberman and writer Jean-Claude Carriere), he appears to have regained the creative autonomy of his early films. The Phantom of Liberty can therefore be seen as a personal film from a director reflecting back on a long creative career.

Themes
Buñuel outlines the film's themes in his autobiography as being:
 The search for truth and the need to abandon the truth as soon as you have found it.
 The implacable nature of social rituals.
 The importance of coincidence.
 The importance of personal morality.
 The essential mystery of all things.

Reception
Buñuel's previous production, The Discreet Charm of the Bourgeoisie (1972), had won the Academy Award for Best Foreign Language Film, and his next and final film, That Obscure Object of Desire (1977) was a more conventional narrative. Below is a selection of critical comments on the film:

The film was nominated for Best Foreign Language Film by the U.S. National Board of Review.

Today, reception for The Phantom of Liberty is highly positive. Rotten Tomatoes reports an 88% approval among 24 critics, with an average rating of 8.4/10.

See also
 Nonlinear narrative

References

External links
 
 
 Sight and Sound article by Michael Wood
 Senses of Cinema article by Gwendolyn Audrey Foster
The Phantom of Liberty: The Serpentine Movements of Chance an essay by Gary Indiana at the Criterion Collection

1974 films
Italian comedy films
Films directed by Luis Buñuel
1970s French-language films
1970s Italian-language films
French nonlinear narrative films
Films produced by Serge Silberman
1970s avant-garde and experimental films
Films with screenplays by Jean-Claude Carrière
Hyperlink films
French avant-garde and experimental films
1970s Italian films
1970s French films